Kannon is the seventh full-length studio album by drone metal band Sunn O))).

Track listing

Production
Produced by Sunn O))) (Stephen O'Malley and Greg Anderson) with Randall Dunn
Engineers: Randall Dunn, Jason Ward
Assistant Engineer: Mell Dettmer
Art direction: Stephen O'Malley
Cover art: Angela Bolliger, photographed by Robyn Vickers, text by Aliza Shvarts
Band portraits: Estelle Hanania

Personnel
Stephen O'Malley – guitars
Greg Anderson – bass guitar, additional guitars on tracks 2 and 3
Attila Csihar – voice
Oren Ambarchi – additional guitars and oscillator on tracks 1 and 2
Randall Dunn – Korg MS-20 on tracks 1 and 2
Steve Moore – Juno 106 on track 2
Brad Mowen – concert bass drum on track 2
Rex Ritter – Moog on track 2
Dempster, Priester, and Moore – conch trio
Credits adapted from official marketing text.

References

2015 albums
Ambient albums by American artists
Concept albums
Southern Lord Records albums
Sunn O))) albums